Route 315 is a road in the Canadian province of Quebec that connects the Gatineau sector of Masson-Angers to Namur. Initially, the road started in Buckingham on Rue Joseph at the city's Main Street (Avenue de Buckingham) just a few kilometres further north, but when A-50 was extended further east as a Buckingham by-pass at its current end at Doherty Road, the section of Route 309 between Buckingham and the junction at Route 148 in Masson-Angers was renumbered Route 315 while Route 309 starts at Doherty Road and A-50.

The section of Route 315 between Mulgrave-et-Derry and Ripon is unpaved and windy.

Municipalities along Route 315
 Gatineau - (Masson-Angers / Buckingham)
 Mayo
 Mulgrave-et-Derry
 Ripon
 Montpellier
 Lac-Simon
 Chénéville
 Namur

Major intersections

See also
 List of Quebec provincial highways

References

External links 
 Official Transports Quebec Map 
 Route 315 on Google Maps

315